Empetrum rubrum, known as red crowberry or diddle-dee (Chilean Spanish: Murtilla de Magallanes), is a species of plant in the family Ericaceae with a distributional range in Chile from Talca (35°S) to Cape Horn (55°S); in areas of adjacent Argentina; in the Falkland Islands; and in Tristan da Cunha. One of its northernmost natural growing places is Laguna del Maule. In Chile this species often grows in high altitude areas close to the tree line and can tolerate alpine conditions such as strong winds and high sun exposure. In the Falkland Islands it is the dominant species across large areas of lowland and upland dwarf shrub heath, and is referenced in the islands' unofficial national anthem. Its fruits are edible.

Gallery

References

rubrum
Plants described in 1806
Flora of Argentina
Flora of Chile
Flora of the Falkland Islands
Flora of Gough Island
Flora of South Georgia Island